Michal Plutnar (born February 21, 1994) is a Czech professional ice hockey player. He is currently playing for HC Bílí Tygři Liberec of the Czech Extraliga.

Plutnar made his Czech Extraliga debut playing with HC Bílí Tygři Liberec during the 2014-15 Czech Extraliga season.

References

External links

1994 births
Living people
HC Bílí Tygři Liberec players
Tri-City Americans players
Czech ice hockey defencemen
People from Chotěboř
Sportspeople from the Vysočina Region
Czech expatriate ice hockey players in the United States